A solecism is a phrase that transgresses the rules of grammar. The term is often used in the context of linguistic prescription; it also occurs descriptively in the context of a lack of idiomaticness.

Etymology
The word originally was used by the Greeks for what they perceived as grammatical mistakes in their language. The word was used to indicate to reduce something to absurdity. Ancient Athenians considered the dialect of the inhabitants of Soli, Cilicia to be a corrupted form of their pure Attic dialect, and labelled the errors in the form as "solecisms" (Greek: σολοικισμοί, soloikismoí; sing.: σολοικισμός, soloikismós). Therefore, when referring to similar grammatical mistakes heard in the speech of Athenians, they described them as "solecisms" and that term has been adopted as a label for grammatical mistakes in any language; in Greek there is often a distinction in the relevant terms in that a mistake in semantics (i.e., a use of words with other-than-appropriate meaning or a neologism constructed through application of generative rules by an outsider) is called a barbarism ( barbarismos), whereas solecism refers to mistakes in syntax, in the construction of sentences.

Examples

See also 
 Catachresis
 Disputed English grammar
 English as She Is Spoke
 Fowler's Modern English Usage
 Malapropism
 Prescription and description
 Error (linguistics)
 Zeugma, a rhetorical use of solecism for effect

References

External links

Grammar
English grammar
Ancient Greek
Linguistic error
Sociolinguistics

es:Solecismo